Benjamin Strasser (born 9 February 1987) is a German lawyer and politician of the Free Democratic Party (FDP) who has been serving as a member of the Bundestag from the state of Baden-Württemberg since 2017, representing the Ravensburg district.

In addition to his parliamentary work, Strasser has been serving as Parliamentary State Secretary in the Federal Ministry of Justice in the coalition government of Chancellor Olaf Scholz since 2021.

Early life and career 
Strasser attended the Realschule at the St. Konrad educational centre and the Wirtschaftsgymnasium in Ravensburg. After graduating from high school, he studied law at the University of Konstanz. He completed his legal studies in 2012 with the first state examination in law. 

After his legal clerkship at the Regional Court of Stuttgart, which he completed with the second state examination in 2014, Strasser worked as a parliamentary advisor to Ulrich Goll in the State Parliament of Baden-Württemberg. In this function he was also responsible for the parliament's inquiry into the National Socialist Underground (NSU). Since 2016 he has been a lawyer in Ravensburg.

Political career 
Strasser became a member of the Bundestag in the 2017 German federal election. He is a member of the Committee on Internal Affairs. In this capacity, he serves as his parliamentary group’s rapporteur on the emergency services, including the Federal Police, the Federal Criminal Police Office (BKA) and emergency medical services, among others. In 2020, he became his parliamentary group’s spokesperson on religion and the fight against antisemitism. 

In addition to his committee assignments, Strasser co-chairs the German-Austrian Parliamentary Friendship Group and is a member of the German-Israeli Parliamentary Friendship Group.

Amid a 2020 controversy about the FDP’s relationship with the Alternative for Germany (AfD), Strasser was appointed by Christian Lindner to chair the parliamentary group’s task force on developing strategies against right-wing populism. 

In the negotiations to form a so-called traffic light coalition of the Social Democratic Party (SPD), the Green Party and the FDP following the 2021 federal elections, Strasser was part of his party's delegation in the working group on homeland security, civil rights and consumer protection, co-chaired by Christine Lambrecht, Konstantin von Notz and Wolfgang Kubicki.

Other activities 
 German Foundation for International Legal Cooperation (IRZ), Member of the Board of Trustees (since 2022)
 Stiftung Forum Recht, Member of the Board of Trustees (since 2022)

References

External links 

  
 Bundestag biography 
 

 

 

1987 births
Living people
People from Weingarten, Württemberg
Members of the Bundestag for the Free Democratic Party (Germany)
Members of the Bundestag for Baden-Württemberg
Members of the Bundestag 2017–2021
Members of the Bundestag 2021–2025